Cataonia erubescens is a species of moth in the family Crambidae. It is found in Spain, Greece, Turkey and Turkmenistan.

References

Moths described in 1877
Odontiini
Moths of Europe
Moths of Asia
Taxa named by Hugo Theodor Christoph